The Rolls-Royce Marine Olympus is a marine gas turbine based on the Rolls-Royce Olympus aircraft turbojet engine.

History
The first Marine Olympus was built for the German Navy. In 1962 BSEL was contracted to provide the gas-generator and Brown Boveri was contracted to provide a two-stage long-life marine power turbine. A test bed was built for extensive shore trials. Construction of the ship which was intended for gas-turbine power was abandoned. Test running of the next marine Olympus began in 1966. The power turbine was of a single stage operating at 5,600 rpm utilising wide-chord blades. Beginning its sea trials in early 1968, Turunmaa, a 700-ton corvette of the Finnish Navy was the first Olympus-powered warship to enter service, some six months before , the first British ship which had been refitted to trial the propulsion system for the Royal Navy.

The TM1 and TM2 variants comprised a power turbine baseplate carrying the turbine and the gas generator mountings, and differed significantly only in the construction of the power turbine structure, which was a steel casting on the TM1 and a fabrication on the TM2. All TM1 and TM2 installations were fitted with an A-rated gas generator, serial numbers 2013xx.

The TM3 comprised a similar power turbine baseplate plus a gas generator enclosure, an air intake enclosure, and many support services including ventilation and fire extinguishing systems. All TM3 installations were fitted with a B-rated gas generator, serial numbers 2017xx.

Variants

Olympus TM1

 nominal. Installed ratings quoted where known.

 Finnish Navy
 Turunmaa-class corvettes — one Olympus, three diesels.
 Royal Navy
 Type 82 destroyer,  — two Olympus, two steam turbines.

Olympus TM2
 nominal. Installed ratings quoted where known.

 Iranian Navy
 Royal Malaysian Navy
 Libyan Navy

Olympus TM3
 nominal. Installed ratings quoted where known.

Royal Navy
 Type 22 frigates Batch 1 and 2 — two Olympus, two Tyne.
Argentine Navy
Brazilian Navy
Nigerian Navy
  frigate — two Olympus, two diesels.
 Royal Thai Navy
 Hellenic Navy
  frigates — two Olympus, two Tyne.
 French Navy
 Belgian Navy
 Royal Netherlands Navy
 Japan Maritime Self Defense Force
 Ishikari-class destroyer escort — one Olympus, one diesel.
  — two Olympus, two Tyne.

Specifications

See also

References

External links

 Rolls-Royce.com Spey Marine gas turbine page

Aero-derivative engines
Gas turbines
Marine engines